Mauro Del Giudice (20 May 1857, in Rodi Garganico – 14 February 1951, in Rome) was an Italian magistrate, jurist and writer.

Biography
During the period of Fascism he was a great supporter of the independence of magistrates. In 1924, together with judge Umberto Tancredi, he was charged with the investigation into the murder of Giacomo Matteotti. Convinced of the guilt of the regime, he showed great tenacity in resisting bribes and external pressures during the conduct of the trial. 

However, this intransigence cost him his job, probably by a direct involvement of Mussolini, through a promotion that forced him to leave his office in Rome for Catania. Later, he was forcibly retired, and moved to Vieste with his brother Luigi.

In the Florestano Vancini's film The Assassination of Matteotti (1973), Del Giudice is played by Vittorio De Sica.

Bibliography 
DEL GIUDICE MAURO, La legge penale nel tempo: tesi di diritto penale comparato, Tipografia del Commercio, Naples 1882.
DEL GIUDICE MAURO, Il fenomeno giuridico nella scienza sociale: introduzione allo studio della filosofia del diritto, Tipografia italiana, Rome 1908.
DEL GIUDICE MAURO, La Scuola Storica Italiana del Diritto i suoi fondatori, Colitti, Campobasso 1918.
DEL GIUDICE MAURO, Germanicae res, Colitti, Campobasso 1918.
DEL GIUDICE MAURO, Problemi di ieri… e di domani, Tipografia Italiana, Rome 1918.
DEL GIUDICE MAURO, Finalità e funzione della giustizia popolare in corte d’assise, Colitti, Campobasso 1923.
DEL GIUDICE MAURO, Pietro Giannone nella storia del diritto e nella filosofia della storia (Conference of 1921), in “Studio giuridico napoletano”, vol. 12 (1925), pt. 2, pp. 6–44. Il saggio è stato ripubblicato da Mario Simone nei Quaderni di Capitanata, Amministrazione provinciale di Capitanata, Foggia 1974.
DEL GIUDICE MAURO, Il potere giudiziario al cospetto del nuovo parlamento, Catania, Edizioni del Corriere di Sicilia, 1948 
DEL GIUDICE MAURO, Cronistoria del processo Matteotti; A. Scabelloni e S. Migliorino; 
FILIPPO TURATI, L’epicedio, Lo Monaco, Palermo 1954, Opere nuove, Rome 1985.
DI TIZIO LUCIANO, La giustizia negata. Dietro le quinte del processo Matteotti, introduction by Ottaviano Del Turco, Ianieri Edizioni, 2006.
BENEGIANO MARCELLO, A scelta del Duce: il processo Matteotti a Chieti, Texus, L’Aquila 2006

Unpublished sources 
 The Central State Archives of Rome retains in the fund of the Rome Corte d'Assise all documentation of the investigation against the accused of Matteotti murder.

References

Filmography 
 The Assassination of Matteotti ("Il delitto Matteotti"), 1973, directed by Florestano Vancini.

External links 
 Article on Mauro del Giudice

1857 births
1951 deaths
Italian jurists
Italian male writers
20th-century jurists